The New Jersey Women's Heritage Trail is a collaborative effort between the New Jersey's Historic Preservation Office, part of the New Jersey Department of Environmental Protection, and 94 historic sites statewide to raise awareness about the roles played by women in shaping the history of state of New Jersey.

Described by The Township Journal as the "nation's first comprehensive survey of women's historic sites", the statewide educational initiative had its genesis in the nation's first annual conference to explore ways to raise awareness regarding the role that women have played in the nation's history. Held in Bryn Mawr, Pennsylvania in 1994, that conference was presented collaboratively by the state's Historic Preservation Office, the Alice Paul Centennial Foundation, and Preservation New Jersey. It helped pave the way for New Jersey's passage of legislation in 1999 which authorized funding "to begin research to identify historic sites associated with New Jersey women."

Sites
As of 2018, more than 90 sites are included related to:
Acorn Hall, Women of the Crane–Hone Family
Alice Stokes Paul's childhood home
Annis Boudinot Stockton, a Colonial era poet
Atlantic City Convention Hall where Miss America Pageants have taken place
Clara Barton, a Civil War era nurse and the founder of the first public school in New Jersey
Alice Paul, suffragist
Anne Morrow Lindbergh
Millicent Fenwick, political leader
Home of abolitionist Quaker Abigail Goodwin and her sister Elizabeth who helped and housed runaway slaves along on the Underground Railroad and organized with other leading abolitionists.
Rebecca Estell Bourgeois Winston
Women's Federation Memorial at Palisades Interstate Park
The Victor building of the Victor Talking Machine Company where women worked at 1 Market Street, between Delaware and Front Streets
 Bridget Smith House at 124 Randolph Avenue in Morris County, Mine Hill Township where Irish immigrant wives and families lived after their husbands were killed in mines
Brookdale Farm in Thompson Park, 805 Newman Springs Road, Lincroft, where social welfare reformer Geraldine Morgan Thompson (1872–1967) lived
Martha Brookes Hutcheson's gardens at what is now Bamboo Brook Outdoor Education Center
Sara Spencer Washington's Hotel Brigantine
Roosevelt Common designed by Marjorie Sewell Cautley
Esther Saunders burial site at Salem Friends Burial Ground
Smithville Park in Easthampton, New Jersey where Agnes Gilkerson (1838–1881) was involved in the development of worker's village Smithville and edited a newspaper
Jarena Lee's gravesite at Mt. Pisgah Church
Elizabeth Cady Stanton House
Mary Teresa Norton House where Mary Teresa Norton lived when she became the first woman elected to the U.S. Congress
Whitesbog Village where Elizabeth Coleman White developed blueberry plants for the commercial trade
Rockingham preserved by the work of Josephine Swann and Kate McFarlane
Mary Catherine Phillips's contributions to Consumers' Research, Bowerstown
Plainfield Garden Club's care for the Shakespeare Garden at Cedar Brook Park

See also
 List of women's organizations
 Women's history

References

Heritage trails
Historic sites in New Jersey
History of women in New Jersey